2003 Nadimarg massacre was the killing of 24 Kashmiri Pandits in the village of Nadimarg in Pulwama District of Indian-administered Kashmir on 23 March 2003. The Government of India blamed militants from the Pakistan-based terrorist group, Lashkar-e-Taiba but failed to secure convictions.

Background

In early 1990, faced by the rising Kashmir insurgency and fearing persecution and physical harm, the majority of Kashmiri Hindus, who are called Kashmiri Pandits, fled the Kashmir Valley to makeshift camps across Jammu division. Small numbers remained within the Valley.

The attack
Armed Islamic militants came dressed in counterfeit military uniforms to Nadimarg, near Shopian in the Pulwama district. The attack took place between 11 pm and midnight. Victims included 11 men, 11 women, and two small boys who were lined up and shot and killed by the gunmen. The victims ranged from a 65-year-old man to a 2-year-old boy.

Perpetrators
The perpetrators belonged to the internationally-designated terrorist organization Lashkar-e-Taiba and were led by their self-styled 'commander' Zia Mustafa. He was arrested in 2003 and held in prison. In October 2021, Mustafa was taken out of jail by security forces to identify militant hideouts in a forest in Poonch. However, in the subsequent encounter with the militants, he was killed in cross-fire.

The aftermath
Three other Lashkar-e-Taiba militants suspected to be responsible for this massacre were gunned down by Mumbai police on 29 March 2003. Another Lashkar-e-Taiba Militant suspected of participating in the massacre was arrested in April 2003. Christina Rocca, then the US Assistant Secretary of State for South Asia, argued for the need for US to remain "actively and effectively engaged", pointing out to this massacre. In an editorial in Pakistan's Dawn, Kunwar Idris criticised the massacre and said "Pundits are children of no lesser god that two hundred thousand of them should be driven out of their homes and the remaining few should be left to die a gruesome death." Chris Patten European Commissioner for External Relations and United Nations Secretary-General Kofi Annan also condemned the massacre. India accused Pakistan of being involved in this massacre and said that it would deal with Pakistan with strength and resolve. The police issued an arrest warrant in the Nadimarg massacre case, naming Zai Mustafa, alias Abdullah of Rawalkote, Pakistan.
Intercepts by the intelligence agencies point out that there was a possible involvement of the Lashkar-e-Taiba and the Jaish-e-Mohammed groups which have been operating in the Shupian area.

The then chief minister Mufti Mohammad Sayeed promised increased police protection -  however, the few remaining terror stricken Kashmiri Pandits decided to leave the area.

The US Ambassador to India Robert D. Blackwill condemned the massacre of 24 Kashmiri Pandits in Jammu and Kashmir and said Washington "look forward to the terrorists being brought to justice swiftly".

The US Secretary of State Powell and British foreign minister Straw issued a joint statement of 27 March 2003 and condemned the Nadimarg massacre, urged respect for the Line of Control, called on Pakistan to end infiltration across it and urged Pakistan to do its utmost to discourage acts of violence by militants in J&K.

In popular culture
 2022: The climax of Hindi movie The Kashmir Files, written and directed by Vivek Agnihotri, is based on the massacre. The movie shows Islamic militants lining up 24 Kashmiri Hindus in Nadimarg and shooting all of them, including a baby.

References

Further reading 
 Pravin Swami, The Nadimarg outrage, Frontline, 25 April 2003.
 Safwat Zargar, The death of a Pakistani militant near LoC leaves lingering questions about a massacre in Kashmir, Scroll.in, 2 November 2021.

External links
 Photographs of the Tragedy
 24 Pandits killed in Kashmir, Rediff.com, 24 March 2003. 

21st-century mass murder in India
Massacres in 2003
Human rights abuses in Jammu and Kashmir
Terrorist incidents in India in 2003
Islamic terrorism in India
2003 in India
Massacres in Jammu and Kashmir
Pulwama district
2000s in Jammu and Kashmir
Violence against Hindus in India
Islamic terrorist incidents in 2003
March 2003 events in India
Persecution of Hindus